Izbenica is a village in the municipality of Varvarin, Serbia. According to the 2002 census, the village has a population of  531 people.

References

Populated places in Rasina District